Fernando de Noronha Marine National Park is a national park in the state of Pernambuco, Brazil.

Location

The Fernando de Noronha Marine National Park covers part of the island of Fernando de Noronha, a municipality of Pernambuco.
The Fernando de Noronha Environmental Protection Area covers the urban part of the island of Fernando de Noronha, while the Fernando de Noronha National Park covers the rest.
The area includes a large marine extension to the Saint Peter and Saint Paul Archipelago, which is also in the National Park.

Administration

The Fernando de Noronha Marine National Park was created by federal decree 96.693 on September 14, 1988.
It is administered by the Chico Mendes Institute for Biodiversity Conservation (ICMBio).
The park is classified as IUCN protected area category II (national park).
The objective is to preserve a natural ecosystem of great ecological relevance and scenic beauty, and to support scientific research, environmental education and interpretation, outdoors recreation and ecotourism.

The unofficial management plan was released on 31 December 1990.
The advisory council was named on 31 December 2001.
A revised management plan with various studies was issued on 29 November 2010.

Environment

Much of the original vegetation of the island was cut when it was used as a prison, to make it harder for prisoners to hide.
After that non-native species, particularly flaxseed, were introduced to feed livestock and have spread uncontrollably.
The teju lizard was introduced in an unsuccessful attempt to control an infestation of rats, and the lizard is also a problem.
Despite the stated objective of recovery of the environment, sheep continued to be farmed on the island.

Protected birds in the park include Noronha elaenia (Elaenia ridleyana), red-billed tropicbird (Phaethon aethereus), white-tailed tropicbird (Phaethon lepturus), Audubon's shearwater (Puffinus lherminieri), Noronha vireo (Vireo gracilirostris).
Other protected species in the park include the crabs Johngarthia lagostoma and Percnon gibbesi, the loggerhead sea turtle (Caretta caretta), green sea turtle (Chelonia mydas), hawksbill sea turtle (Eretmochelys imbricata), olive ridley sea turtle (Lepidochelys olivacea), the lemon shark (Negaprion brevirostris), the starfish Echinaster (Othilia) guyanensis, the slate pencil urchin (Eucidaris tribuloides), the sea ginger coral Millepora alcicornis and the coral Phyllogorgia dilatata,

Notes

Sources

1988 establishments in Brazil
National parks of Brazil
Protected areas of Pernambuco
Ramsar sites in Brazil